Satın Alınan Adam is a Turkish film directed by Arshavir Alyanak. The film got inspired from a novel.

Plot 
The main character in the movie is an amateur writer whose marriage was aimed get money for making his dream to come true. Naci who worked for one of the wealthy lawyer got an offer that if he married the daughter of the lawyer Mine, he would be given adequate money and printing press to publish his writings. But according to the deal, the couple must divorce at the end of the year. As he accepted the offer, Naci was able to publish his writings. However, the marriage of Naci and Mine will have unexpected results.

Actors 

 Goksel Arsoy
 Belgin Doruk
 Mualla Fırat
 Nubar Terziyan
 Salih Tozan
 Mümtaz Ener
 Semih Sezerli
 Necdet Tosun

References 

1960s Turkish-language films
Turkish romantic drama films
1960 films
Turkish black-and-white films
Films based on Turkish novels